The 1877 State of the Union Address was written by the 19th president, Rutherford B. Hayes.  It was given on Monday, December 3, to both houses of the 45th United States Congress. In it, he said, 

"There has been a general reestablishment of order and of the orderly administration of justice. Instances of remaining lawlessness have become of rare occurrence; political turmoil and turbulence have disappeared; useful industries have been resumed; public credit in the Southern States has been greatly strengthened, and the encouraging benefits of a revival of commerce between the sections of the country lately embroiled in civil war are fully enjoyed."   He gave this address right after troops were withdrawn from the South.  The Reconstruction Era ended in March 1877, and the Southern United States were freed from Republican control.

References 

State of the Union addresses
Presidency of Rutherford B. Hayes
45th United States Congress
State of the Union Address
State of the Union Address
State of the Union Address
December 1877 events
State of the Union